Uranie was a frigate of the French Navy launched in 1788. She took part in a frigate action in 1793, capturing HMS Thames, and was renamed Tartu in honour of her captain, Jean-François Tartu, who was killed in the action. The Royal Navy captured her in 1797.  She served as HMS Uranie until the Royal Navy sold her in 1807.

French service
At the action of 24 October 1793, under Jean-François Tartu, she engaged , which she reduced to a hulk before disengaging. Tartu was killed; he was hailed as a hero, and Uranie was renamed Tartu in his honour.

British service

On 28 July 1800, Uranie captured the French privateer schooner Revanche, which was armed with fourteen 6-pounder guns and had a crew of 80 men.

On 1 September 1804 Bess, Grantham, master, foundered at sea. Uranie saved the crew and a small part of the cargo.

In 1807, she detected , but failed to engage. Complaints by her crew led to the court martial of the captain for "failure to do his utmost to bring the enemy's frigate to action".

Citations and references
Citations

References
 HMS Uranie, Naval database
 Les bâtiments ayant porté le nom de Tartu

External links
 

Age of Sail frigates of France
1788 ships
Frigates of the French Navy